Toni Petkovski, also known as Toni Zen, is a Macedonian rapper and producer. The former member of music band Urbana Dimenzija has been a pop artist for more than 8 years.

Career

Beginnings
In the late 90s, under the influence of American hip-hop, Toni, using the stage name "Toni Montana", started performing rap music. The first group he was active in was called "105". The group recorded demos played only by a certain hip-hop radio program on Channel 103. In 2002, along with DJ Cvare, he formed the group Urbana Dimenzija. During this time, Toni changed his stage name from Toni Montana to Toni Zen. He performed at numerous events in Macedonia, including the Street Beats Festival and hip-hop night at the Taksirat Festival as the guest of Jeru the Damaja, Afu Ra, Guru and Edo Maajka.

Solo career (2005–present)
Toni Zen became a solo artist in 2005, working on several projects in close cooperation with Single Mode, Martin Srbinovski, Color and Bisera (Gemini), Tamara Todevska, Robert Bilbilov, Jovan Jovanov, among others. He released three studio albums which featured rap and hip-hop hits including "Vo Poln Efekt", "Skandal", "Mi Casa es Su Casa", and "Vo Moj Stil". In 2010, Toni Zen was an opening act for the concert of world superstar 50 Cent, held in the Boris Trajkovski Sports Center in Skopje. That summer, he held his first concert in Ohrid's Ancient Theatre. Later that summer, he was invited to the Philippines with other ex-Yugoslav celebrities to shoot the third season of the regional version of Survivor called  Survivor Srbija VIP: Philippines. He made it to the show's finale, finishing as the first runner-up.

Trivia
 Toni is owner of Tony's Soul Wear, a store that specializes in hip-hop style clothing. The store is located in Skopje's City Mall.

Discography

Albums

 Stihovna agenda (2005)
 Slushaj (2007)
 Vo moj stil (2009)
 Superzen (2011)
 MikroSkopski organizam (2013)
 Od izvorot na izborot (2019)

singles
 Prljavo na Balkan

Video songs
 Zivot (2001)
 Rap fanatik (2001)
 Skopje moj grad (2006)
 Zen Master (2005)
 Vo poln efekt (2003)
 Dali sakas (2008)
 Mi Casa Es Su Casa (2009)
 Скандал
 Во мој стил
 Okey
 Јас сум хип хоп
Moeto Malo (feat Slatkaristika)2011
Super Zen (2011)
Ne Me Zamaraj (2009)
 Nadvor ( Poveke od raper) 2012
 Setila (2013)
 Svetot e tvoj  (2013)
 Pod kontrola (2013)
 Isti (2013)
 Prljavo na Balkan (2016)
 SUM (2019)
 Tishina (2019)

References

External links
 Официјален сајт на Тони Зен
 Тони Зен на MySpace
 Видеа Тони Зен

Macedonian musicians
1983 births
Living people
Musicians from Skopje